For Those I Loved (French: Au nom de tous les miens) is a drama film from 1983 with Michael York, about a Polish Jewish Holocaust survivor who emigrated to the United States in 1946. It was directed by Robert Enrico for Les Productions Mutuelles Ltée.

Plot 
The movie is based on the 1972 book titled For Those I Loved written by Martin Gray. The main character in the book belonged to the Reform Jews, where he lived with his family in Warsaw Ghetto after the German invasion of Poland. The character supports his family with black-market supplies and joins the Resistance. He is deported to the Treblinka camp, where he manages to survive and then escape. Afterwards he joins the partisan forces and then the Red Army, taking part in the Battle of Berlin.

After the war he left the Red Army and went in search of his grandmother, the sole survivor of his family. He found his grandmother in New York and emigrated to America. He became a successful businessman there. Then he married Dina, with whom he had four children. After the birth of their first child, the protagonist moved with his family back to France. There in 1970 his wife and children tragically lost their lives in a forest fire. In 1976 he married again and had three more children. He started a foundation to teach others about his experiences.

Holocaust historian Gitta Sereny has dismissed Gray's autobiographical book as a forgery in a 1979 article in New Statesman magazine, writing that "Gray's For Those I Loved was the work of Max Gallo the ghostwriter, who also produced Papillon. Some of Gray's claims of wartime heroism were dismissed in Poland as untrue by the Silent Unseen Captain Wacław Kopisto.

Cast
 Michael York : Martin Gray
 Jacques Penot : Young Martin Gray
 Brigitte Fossey : Dina Gray
 Macha Méril : Martin's mother
 Helen Hughes : Martin's grandmother
 Jean Bouise : Dr. Ciljimaster
 Wolfgang Müller : Mokotow
 Bruno Wolkowitch : Jurek

Discography
The CD soundtrack composed by Maurice Jarre is available on Music Box Records label.

References

External links
 
 Martin Gray homepage in English
 Biography of Martin Gray on his own webpage 

1983 drama films
1983 films
Canadian drama films
French drama films
Films directed by Robert Enrico
Films scored by Maurice Jarre
English-language Canadian films
English-language French films
Films based on autobiographies
Holocaust films
Films set in the 1940s
Films set in the 1970s
French-language Canadian films
1980s Canadian films
1980s French films